Lapus may refer to:

 Lapus (surname)
 Lăpuș, a commune in Transylvania, Romania
 Lăpuș (disambiguation), for a list of places in Romania sharing that name
 Lapus$, a group of hackers infamous for leaking internal data of many large technology companies